Dmitri Vladimirovich Gusak (born 1 July 1985) is a former Russian professional footballer.

Club career
He played three seasons in the Russian Football National League for FC Petrotrest St. Petersburg, FC Dynamo Bryansk and FC Sportakademklub Moscow.

External links
 

1985 births
Living people
Russian footballers
Association football midfielders
FC Petrotrest players
FC Volga Nizhny Novgorod players
FC Dynamo Bryansk players
Kemi City F.C. players
Kakkonen players
Russian expatriate footballers
Expatriate footballers in Finland
FC Sportakademklub Moscow players